La Unión is a municipality in the northwest of the Olancho Department of Honduras.

History

Early history
La Unión was elevated to municipality status in 1877 and was part of the District of Salamá.

As early as 1852, there was a village called San Francisco de Yocón, which was burned by guerrillas under the command of General José María Medina, who became President of Honduras in 1868. In that time he encouraged a civil war in the Department of Olancho, a product of the intentions of separating this department in an independent republic by its inhabitants in retaliation for the high taxes that the government asked of it from Comayagua (Tithes of Olancho).

Between the years 1876–1883 La Unión was reestablished by decree from President Marco Aurelio Soto. The first houses were those of Mrs. Mary Dilia Vivas, Ms. Paula Almendares, and Lady Camilla Cruz.

The municipality's urban growth was partially because of the regulations that forced the citizens of rural communities near the village that possessed sufficient financial resources to build homes in urban areas, even if they did not live in them. Some families were Los Vargas from farmhouses of El Paraiso, Los Funes of the villages of Palala, Los Zaldivar from the farmshouses of Los Salitres among others.

Among the first mayors to serve La Unión were Mr. Tomas Herrera and Mr. Macario Vargas.

Modern history
The Catholic Church, dedicated in honour of the patron saint San Francisco de Asis, was founded in 1906. The first telegraph line was installed in 1925 by Mr. Martin Murillo. The first school was founded in 1930 and given the name of Francisco Morazan.

In 1983 a committee composed of parents and others was formed by Mrs. Alejandro Carcamo, Rigoberto Rivera, Eleazar Puerto for the construction of a High School Education Center then called Instituto Privado Nocturno Superacion Franciscana. When the government of President Roberto Suazo Córdova with guidance from the deputy for Olancho, Mr. Alejandro Carcamo, formalised its operation they renamed it Instituto Superacion Franciscana.  Its first Director was Professor Victor Almenderez with teachers Noe Menocal, Martin Ramos, Lourdes Padilla and others.

List of Mayors of La Unión, in the modern democratic era:

 1982–1984 Helma Zelaya, originally from San José Choluteca
 1984–1986 Maria Elena Valle Flores, originally from Yocon
 1986–1990 Ramon Alcides Torres Castro, originally from Salamá
 1990–1994 Angel Donaldo Tejeda Menocal, originally from La Unión
 1994–1998 Carmen Lastenia Padilla Rivera, originally from Yocon
 1998–2002 Jose Humberto Rivera, originally from Juticalpa
 2002–2006 Santos Isabel Zelaya Lobo, originally from La Unión
 2006–2010 Santos Domingo Munguia Matute, originally from Mangulile
 2010–2014 Yonis Herrera Tejeda, originally from La Unión
 2014–2018 Renan Alcides Torres Argueta, originally from La Unión
 2018-2022 Ramón Edgardo Cárcamo Rivera, originally from Tegucigalpa MDC
 2022-2026 Dolores Olimpia Almendarez Martinez originally from Yocon

Geography

Limits
La Unión is bounded to the north with Olanchito, to the south with Salamá and El Rosario, to the west with Esquipulas del Norte and Jano and to the east with Yocón and Mangulile. Its capital is located in a flat area near the right bank of the river Camote.

Villages 
The municipality has the following five villages:
 La Unión
 El Díctamo
 Los Encuentros
 Palala
 Guanacaste

The distribution by resolution of the Municipal Corporation is:

El Dictamo Village following the farmhouses in order of population.
El Junco
El Empedrado
El Rio
La Laguna.

Palala Village following the farmhouses in order of population.
Paso Real
Cerro Verde
Vallecito
Sabana Grande
El Cacao
Timis
La Leona
Las Cañas
La Pita
Rancho Quemado
Yuscaran
El Alto
El Limoncito

Los Encuentros Village following the farmhouses in order of population.
El Pacon
Los Planes
El Cacao
El Higueral
San Francisco
Los Salitres

El Guanacaste Village following the farmhouse of.
El Naranjo

Demographics
At the time of the 2013 Honduras census, La Unión municipality had a population of 7,691. Of these, 99.34% were Mestizo, 0.30% Indigenous, 0.26% White,  0.09% Black or Afro-Honduran and 0.01% others.

References 

Municipalities of the Olancho Department